Skenea valvatoides is a species of small sea snail, a marine gastropod mollusk in the family Skeneidae.

Description
The diameter of the shell attains 3.1 mm. The rather solid, yellowish white shell is narrowly umbilicated. it is opaque, glossy, with a few irregular growth lines. The spire has a rather flattened apex. The suture is deep. The four whorls are well-rounded. The peristome is considerably expanded.

Distribution
This species occurs in the Atlantic Ocean at bathyal depths off Portugal.

References

 Jeffreys J. G., 1878–1885: On the mollusca procured during the H. M. S. "Lightning" and "Porcupine" expedition; Proceedings of the Zoological Society of London; Part 1 (1878): 393–416 pl. 22–23. Part 2 (1879): 553–588 pl. 45-46 [ottobre 1879]. Part 3 (1881): 693–724 pl. 61. Part 4 (1881): 922–952 pl. 70-71 [1882]. Part 5 (1882): 656–687 pl. 49-50 [1883]. Part 6 (1883): 88–115 pl. 19–20. Part 7 (1884): 111–149 pl. 9-10. Part 8 (1884): 341–372 pl. 26–28. Part 9 (1885): 27–63 pl. 4-6 
 Gofas, S.; Le Renard, J.; Bouchet, P. (2001). Mollusca, in: Costello, M.J. et al. (Ed.) (2001). European register of marine species: a check-list of the marine species in Europe and a bibliography of guides to their identification. Collection Patrimoines Naturels, 50: pp. 180–213

External links

valvatoides
Gastropods described in 1883